The Porsangerfjorden is a fjord in Troms og Finnmark county, Norway.

Name
The fjord is officially named Porsangerfjorden in Norwegian. It is also known informally as Porsangen, but that is not an official name.

Geography
It is located in the municipalities of Nordkapp and Porsanger and it empties out into the Barents Sea. The large island of Magerøya and the Porsanger Peninsula lie along the western shore of the fjord, and the Sværholt Peninsula lies along the eastern shore of the fjord. The Helnes Lighthouse sits at the mouth of the fjord, on the western coast. The village of Lakselv sits at the innermost part (southern part) of the fjord. Other settlements along the fjord include the villages of Brenna, Børselv, Indre Billefjord, Kistrand, Olderfjord, Repvåg, and Nordvågen. The town of Honningsvåg is also located near the mouth of the fjord. There are many islands inside the fjord, notably Tamsøya and Reinøya.

Important Bird Area
A 50,290 ha area comprising the inner (southern) part of the fjord, as well as several small islands and a strip along the mid-eastern shore, has been designated an Important Bird Area (IBA) by BirdLife International because it supports populations of many birds, including lesser white-fronted geese, long-tailed ducks, common eiders, velvet scoters, red-breasted mergansers, bar-tailed godwits, red knots and purple sandpipers. Habitats include mudflats, heathland, grassland, salt marsh, mires and birch forest.

Media gallery

References

Fjords of Troms og Finnmark
Porsanger
Nordkapp
Important Bird Areas of Norway
Important Bird Areas of the Arctic